Luka Lalić is a Serbian football manager currently working as Technical Director for Lion City Sailors FC.

Coaching career 
Just after breaking into the first team of FK Vozdovac at the age of seventeen, Luka had to end his career due to heart condition. Upon recovery he focused on individual coaching, creating several training programs focused on improving players' physical capabilities. He was also a short-term volunteer coach with Partizan Belgrade.

Asia 
After a few short spells across the Asian continent, Luka eventually founded the first-ever professional academy in Singapore called Turf City FC. Simultaneously, he was also assisting with the first team at Balestier Khalsa, winning the Singapore League Cup with the team in 2013, followed by a short spell with Woodlands Wellington FC. Between 2014 and 2016 Turf City FC teams traveled for various tournaments and tours across Western Europe achieving formidable results along the way. Players from Luka's development program have been picked up by professional teams such as Manchester City F.C., Feyenoord, Fulham F.C., Wolverhampton Wanderers F.C., Leeds United F.C. and many more.

Feyenoord 
During a successful Netherlands tour with Turf City FC in October of 2016, Luka was offered a coaching internship at Feyenoord Academy by Martin van Geel, Feyenoord's Technical director at the time. Eventually, he agreed to the position of international development coach with the club. About a year later, he was awarded a permanent contract and a position as Head of Methodology. However, Luka ended his contract in May 2020 in order to return to Asia.

Lion City Sailors FC 
In June 2020 it was announced that Luka has joined Lion City Sailors FC as Academy Technical Director. In August 2022, he was appointed Head Coach (Interim) of the first team after Head Coach Kim Do-hoon left the club. Subsequently, he was appointed as club's Technical Director at the start of 2023 season.

References

External links 
  Lion City Sailors Academy Launch
  Mozzart Sport (Serbian)
  Zurnal (Serbian)
  Feyenoord News
  Feyenoord Academy Staff 2019/20
  Singapore Business Review

Serbian football managers
Serbian footballers
Association football central defenders
1987 births
Footballers from Belgrade
Living people
Serbian expatriate sportspeople in Singapore
FK Voždovac players